El Hadji Dieye (born 1 January 2002) is a Senegalese professional footballer who plays as a winger for  club Saint-Étienne.

Club career
Dieye joined the reserves of Saint-Étienne 31 August 2021. He made his professional debut with Saint-Étienne in a 5–1 Ligue 1 win over Strasbourg on 17 October 2021.

References

External links
 

2002 births
Living people
Senegalese footballers
Association football wingers
AS Saint-Étienne players
Ligue 1 players
Senegalese expatriate footballers
Senegalese expatriates in France
Expatriate footballers in France